Courtney Cox is an American guitarist and member of the all-female tribute band The Iron Maidens.

Career 
A native of Philadelphia, Courtney Cox started playing guitar around age 13. At 15, she enrolled at The Paul Green School of Rock Music. During her tenure there, she performed in U.S tours with acts including Jon Anderson and Adrian Belew, performing with such artists as George Lynch and Perry Farrell. During that time, Cox co-founded an all-female King Diamond tribute band called Queen Diamond.

At age 19, Cox moved to Los Angeles. In December 2008, she was invited to be a guest performer with the Iron Maidens, and later she became an official member of the band. As a member of the Maidens, Cox's stage name is Adriana Smith, a female version of Iron Maiden guitarist Adrian Smith.  and in Japan. Cox performed with members of Phantom Blue at the Michelle Meldrum Memorial Concert in May 2009 at the Whisky a Go Go in Hollywood, California.

As the first female artist for Caparison Guitars, Cox released the signature model Horus-M3 CC. In 2010, she placed runner-up in Guitar Worlds Buyer's Guide Model Search.

Discography

Videos
Metal Gathering Tour Live in Japan 2010 (2010)

References

External links
 The Iron Maidens official site

Living people
American heavy metal guitarists
1989 births
Guitarists from Philadelphia
21st-century American women guitarists
21st-century American guitarists
Women in metal